Deere & Company, the firm founded by John Deere, began to expand its range of John Deere equipment to include the tractor business in 1876.  The Deere company briefly experimented with building its own tractor models, the most successful of which was the Dain all-wheel drive.

Foundation to 1948

Dain all-wheel drive

The Dain all-wheel drive was the first tractor produced by John Deere, and had only a single rear wheel.  In 1911, Deere purchased the Dain Manufacturing Company of Ottumwa, Iowa.  The next year, Deere decided to  design its own tractor, and Dain founder, Joseph Dain Sr., was directed to design that tractor.  After several prototypes, the design was finalized in 1917, and 100 production units were ordered.  By 1919 when that production run was complete, Deere had purchased the Waterloo Boy Company.  Although the Dain AWD was ahead of its time, with features such as a shift-on-the-fly transmission, Deere halted production in late 1919, partly because the cost of the Dain tractor was double that of the Waterloo Boy, and partly because of the death of Dain Sr.

Waterloo Boy

The predecessor of the Waterloo Boy came about in 1892.  It was made by thresher-man John Froelich.  It is called the "Froelich tractor". In March 1918, Deere & Company decided to continue its foray into the tractor business by purchasing the Waterloo Gasoline Engine Company which manufactured the popular Waterloo Boy tractor at its facilities in Waterloo, Iowa.

Deere & Company continued to sell tractors under the Waterloo Boy name until 1923.

Model D (Spoker Model D)

Despite a rather severe farm economy depression at the time, Deere & Company management decided to build the Model D prototype in 1923, designed by Muir L. Frey (father of Ford Mustang designer Donald N. Frey).  The Deere Model D was produced from March 1, 1923, to July 3, 1953, the longest production span of all the two-cylinder John Deere tractors.  Over 160,000 were made.

It was not, however, the first tractor to bear the Deere name; as a number of Deere experimental tractors, and the John Deere Dain all-wheel drive tractor (of which approximately 100 were produced during 1918 and 1919) had all carried the Deere name before the Model D.

By 1925, Deere & Company realized the standard Model D did not meet customers' needs for industrial applications. Steel wheels were not suitable for hard surfaces, and the gearing was too slow for safe road speeds. In 1926, Deere & Company advertised the model as the "John Deere industrial tractor", with  rear wheels and  fronts with solid tires. This became known as the "DI". Options also included wheel weights.

GP tractor
On June 20, 1928, the model designation was changed from "C" to "GP", to avoid confusion with the "D" when dealers were phoning in orders to the factory. "GP" stands for "general purpose". This new model GP had the same horsepower, engine displacement, weight, and three-speed transmission as the model C.  The GP's first serial number was 200211.

The John Deere Model GP was built in five distinct versions through the course of its production:
The standard-front GP, or John Deere standard, built from March 1928 to February 1935
The John Deere two-wheel tricycle-front GP, or GP-tricycle, of which twenty-three units were built between August 1928 and April 1929
The John Deere GP wide-tread, or GPWT, built from November 1929 to November 1933
The John Deere GP wide-tread Series P, a GPWT with narrowed rear tread width designed to suit potato rows, built between January and August 1930
The John Deere general purpose orchard tractor, or "GPO", from April 1931 to April 1935.  This tractor had specialized shielding for groves and orchards and around low-hanging branches.  Some GPOs were fitted with crawler undercarriages from the Lindeman Brothers in Yakima, Washington.  These are commonly known as "GPO Lindemans".

The John Deere Model A came off the assembly line in April 1934. There were eight different model A variations. Some of these were tricycle, hi-crop, orchard, single front tire, and industrial models. The tricycle wheel design, patterned after that of the Farmall tractor, reduced steering effort, and greatly increased maneuverability. The Model B was introduced in June 1934. This tractor had a shorter frame than the Model A, but it was eventually lengthened so it could use some of the same equipment that the larger models A and G used. There were also eight different Model B tractor variations, the same as the larger Model A.

The much larger G model arrived in 1937. Deere & Company publicized the G as a three-plow tractor, and it was built until 1941, when the GM (G, modernized) replaced it. The GM model was made from 1942 to 1947. The G model got a restyled front at this point, as did the other John Deere tractor models. The GM had electric starting and lighting added to its options. During its production time, the G tractor was available as a hi-crop, single front wheel, and styled.

Un-styled row crop tractors

Deere & Company made their first un-styled row crop tractor in 1929, to compete with the Farmall.  It was a modified GP tractor, with adjustable rear axle track (distance between wheels on the same axle), and a narrow front end.  In 1933, Deere & Company started experimenting with what would come to be known as the Model A.  The new Model A went into production in 1934.  The A launched John Deere into the row crop farming market.  The A was by far the most popular two-cylinder tractor that Deere & Company produced.  The next year the Model B was introduced.  It was one third smaller than the A, which made it ideal for smaller farms.  A few years later, the Model G was introduced in 1937.  It remained un-styled for several more years than the A and B.  The un-styled tractors launched Deere & Company into the row crop farming market which they are still a major part of today. The model designation was actually labeled on the support between the seat and the platform. Any other location is an incorrect restoration. This continued onto the styled tractors until 1947.

The Deere & Company very nearly went bankrupt in the Great Depression.  Only a large order of tractors for the Soviet Union kept the company going.

 John Deere A 1934-1939
 John Deere B 1935-1939
 John Deere D 1923- 1939
 John Deere G 1937-1941

Streamlined look
In 1937, John Deere hired well known industrial designer Henry Dreyfuss from New York City to re-style Deere & Company's agricultural equipment, especially its tractors.  In the fall of 1937, a John Deere tractor engineer was sent to New York to ask Dreyfuss to redesign the tractors.  Legend has it that Dreyfuss was so intrigued by the project, that he took a train to Waterloo that very night.  Dreyfuss learned to operate the tractors, and worked with them in the field to gain firsthand knowledge of the changes that needed to be made.  The first two letter series tractors (the A and B) were the first to receive the new modern styling, and other models were added later.  The Dreyfuss styling was intended to help Deere & Company compete with the forthcoming Farmall "letter series" of tractors, which, along with the Ford-Ferguson, were John Deere's largest competition at this time.  Dreyfuss and the Waterloo engineers perfected the styled design that was used on all John Deere tractors, with only minor changes through to 1959.

The 1930s and 1940s saw a large number of different John Deere models emerge, as small farmer.s emerging from their Depression troubles increasingly turned from horses to tractors. Deere & Company's GM model was introduced in 1942, and was made until 1947. The G model got a restyled front at this point, as did the other John Deere tractors models. The GM had electric start and lights added to its options. During its production time, the G tractor was available in hi-crop and single front wheel versions. The G was restyled in 1941, but did not start to roll off the assembly line until early 1942. Like the smaller A and B tractors, the G model had the six-speed transmission added to it. In 1946, the 1946 model "D" had a  engine, which was enormous for the day. Two new additions to the tractor line, the M and R models, were also added.

After the models A and B got new styling, both tractors were given six-speed transmissions in late 1940.  The A was  out of a  engine, while the smaller B was both , reflecting the earlier and later updates between 1938 and 1946.  The 14.84 Model H was given the Dreyfuss look from the time it was introduced in 1938.  The H broke a fuel economy record when it was tested in Nebraska.  This tractor also had three variations that came out in 1940–1941.  The H tractor was  out of a  engine, and had a three-speed transmission. 1947, all models operator platfoms were updated with, a cushioned seat, new steering cloumn, lights, battery, and electric starting which resulted in an inclosed flywheel.

In 1939, the restyled Model D appeared. Options available on this tractor included electric lighting and starting. In August 1940, Deere & Company introduced the new model LA which was followed by the model LI. The LA had a  engine with 14 belt horsepower. The John Deere G tractor was restyled in 1941, but did not start to roll off the assembly line until early 1942. Like the smaller A and B tractors, the G model also had the six-speed transmission, but also featured electric lights and electric start.

In 1947, Deere & Company opened a new tractor factory in Dubuque, Iowa, built to produce the John Deere Model M.  The M was created to address the increasing demand for small tractors, and compete with the increasingly popular Ford, and the smaller Farmall tractor models.

 John Deere A 1939-1952
 John Deere B 1939-1952
 John Deere H 1938- 1947
 John Deere D 1939- 1953
 John Deere G 1942-19
 John Deere LA 1940-1947
 John Deere M 1947-1953

1949–1959: diesels and post World War II production

After years of testing, Deere & Company released its first proper diesel engined tractor in 1949, the Model R.  The R was also the first John Deere tractor with a live independent power take-off (PTO) equipped with its own clutch. The R also incorporated live hydraulics. PowrTrol, as it was known, provided the operator the ability to lift equipment by the pull of a lever. A pump powered by the PTO clutch provided  of hydraulic pressure to a lever controlled valve. The R was equipped with two engines. The main engine is a two-cylinder, four-stroke, naturally-aspirated  ( bore and stroke), direct injected diesel engine, with a 16:1 compression ratio. The starting engine is also a John Deere two-cylinder,  horizontally opposed gasoline engine. The starting or "pony" engine is electrically started by a six-volt electrical system, and is used to crank the main diesel engine. Testing results with various electrical starting systems for the diesel engine proved to be too bulky, requiring a 24- or 32-volt system. The design of the pony starter Model Rs allowed for hot exhaust gasses to preheat the intake air for the diesel engine, and a common liquid cooling system allowed the pony engine to warm the diesel engine block and head. This provided sufficient cold weather starting aids for the diesel engine that it would reliably run in sub-zero conditions. The R did have several teething problems, as this was Deere & Company's first production diesel engined tractor. Available as a standard tractor only, it did not have an adjustable front axle, nor did it have a three-point hitch. The engine was mainly an up-scaled gasoline engine from the Model D.  The use of a thermosiphon cooling system, and the lack of a three-point bearing crankshaft proved inadequate for diesel engine compression ratios. The R was prone to overheating, and cracking the cylinder head. The lack of a center main bearing in the crankshaft allowed the crankshaft to flex when used as a stationary power-plant on the belt; this would lead to its failure. The live PTO was directed through two 45° bevel gears that proved too small to durably transmit the full torque of the engine. The tractor was fully serviceable at pulling larger equipment efficiently on large acre wheat-land farms.

During the 1950s, the R saw a series of upgrades in the models 80, 820, and 830. The 80 was produced for two years, and 3,500 were produced. It had new features, including power steering and dual hydraulics. The 80 also corrected the other design flaws within the R, such as using a water pump and radiator pressure cap, and the addition of a center crankshaft main bearing.

The 820 and 830 were similar overall, but also differed in their sheet metal exteriors, fuel tank designs, and color schemes. The 820, a larger version of the 720 and the 720, was basically the same as the 70, except for the model number, and that the sides of the hood are painted John Deere yellow. The 720 was upgraded to the 730 for 1959. The 730 featured more contoured bodywork than the 720, and came with more ergonomic features for the operator. Although the 730 had a short production run, it became one of Deere & Company's most popular models. The 730 also featured power steering and 24-volt electric starter motor, instead of the V4 pony starter engine. The 730 was available in diesel, gasoline, and LPG, as well as in row crop tricycle, row crop wide front, standard tread, and hi crop wide front formats. The 730 is very popular with tractor pulling enthusiasts, because of its weight, power, and slow speed.

After making more than one and a quarter (1 ¼) million two-cylinder tractors, Deere & Company switched to four- and six-cylinder engines.  Announcement of the change came after seven years of development, and forty million dollars in retooling.

In October 1959, the company showcased a new large  four-wheel drive (4WD), called the 8010, on the Robert Ottilie Seed Farm north of Marshalltown, Iowa.  It was shown during the largest farming field days event held in Iowa up to that time.  Only one-hundred 8010s were built, and 99 of those were rebuilt at the factory, and re-released as 8020s in 1960.

1960s: New Generation of Power

To introduce its new generation tractors to all of its dealers in a single day, Deere & Company chartered aeroplanes to fly more than 5,000 people to Dallas, Texas, on August 30, 1961.  Deere & Company put their new tractors on display outside the Cotton Bowl, and inside Neiman Marcus.  The day marked the release of a revolutionary line of farm tractors, with sleek new styling by Henry Dreyfuss, that would soon become the standard by which all other farm tractors would be measured.  These tractors were the 1010, 2010, 3010 and 4010.

These were soon followed by the model 5010 standard introduced in 1962.  The 5010 was the first two-wheel drive to exceed  at the PTO and drawbar.  Designed for the western wheat-lands, the 5000 series was never available as a row crop model.  In 1963, the 3010 and 4010 were replaced by the 3020 and 4020, both of which were offered with a powershift transmission designed by a former Ford employee.  The 4020 is one of the most popular tractors Deere & Company has ever made.  The year 1965 brought the 5020 standard, which was the industry's most powerful two-wheel-drive model, along with the 1020, 2020, and  model 2510.  By 1966, the 4020 accounted for 48% of all John Deere tractor sales.  Also that year, a row crop version of the 5020 was introduced.

In the late 1960s, Deere & Company pioneered the roll-over protection structure to protect the driver from injury in the event of a tractor roll-over.  John Deere invited the competition to view a demonstration of its new Roll-Guard.  Deere recommended that all tractors include this safety feature, and offered to share its design and test data with its competitors.  Deere & Company also encouraged farmers to retro-fit their tractors with this safety feature, and offered roll guards at cost to farmers who wished to install them on their older new generation tractors.

In 1968, nine new models appeared: the 820, 920, 1120, 1520, 2120, 2520, 4000, 4520, WA-14, and WA-17.  The WA-14 and WA-17 were articulated four-wheel-drive tractors, built by Wagner under a no compete clause, which extended to 5 years after deere dropped the line. thus resulting in wagner going bankrupt.  The 4520 was Deere & Company's first turbocharged tractor.  The 3020 and 4020 were updated with new features, and the 5020 model had a drawbar power increase to an industry leading .  The 4000 was a high horsepower-to-weight tractor, designed to be a "runner" rather than a "lugger".  The 4000 used the same engine as the popular 4020, but weighed almost  less.  According to Deere & Company, the 4000 could, in the same amount of time, pull a four-bottom plow fast enough to cover the same acreage as a 4020 pulling a five-bottom plow.  The John Deere 4000 was also an economy tractor, providing the same horsepower as the 4020, with fewer features and smaller rear axles.

1970s: Generation II
During the 1970s, Deere & Company introduced 36 new models.  In 1972, John Deere introduced the Generation II tractors.  Generation II was characterized by the optional Sound Guard body, which was the first truly successful integrated tractor cab.  This innovative cab was isolated from the tractor by large rubber bushings, which dampened vibrations, and the interior was insulated with foam to reduce noise, and protect the operator from extreme temperatures outside.  A foam pad on the firewall and sheets of lead under the dash greatly reduced engine noise inside the cab.  The Sound Guard body also featured a rounded front windshield with an integrated door.  The door post was in line with the exhaust and air intake pipes, which route through the hood for the best forward visibility possible.  Fully integrated heating and air conditioning was standard equipment, and it also featured windshield wipers, a dome light, a red interior lamp to illuminate the gear shift levers and hydraulic controls during nighttime operation, and speakers for an optional AM/FM radio, which many farmers added because they found the cab so quiet they could actually hear it.  When it was introduced, it was the quietest tractor cab in the industry, and a vast improvement over the aftermarket cabs that Deere & Company had previously retrofitted to its tractors.

The Generation II tractors also offered other innovative features not available on previous John Deere models, such as a Quad Range transmission that improved on Deere's proven Synchro Range transmission, by adding a high and low gears in each range, and Deere's new Perma-Clutch; a wet clutch that would last much longer, virtually the life of the tractor.

1970, the  4320, the  4620, and  7020 were introduced;
1970 in Argentina, introduced the local-made 20 series, with the 1420, 2420, 3420, and 4420;
1971, the  2030, the  6030, and 7520 (also at ) were added;
1972, on Saturday August 19, John Deere dealers held an open house to usher in their 'Generation II' tractors.  The four new tractors were the  4030,  4230,  4430 and  4630; there were billed as "Sound Idea" tractors because of their innovative Sound Guard Body operators enclosure;
1973 would see the final New Generation utility tractors launched; the  830,  1530, and  2630;
1974, the first two models in the Generation II four-wheel drive range appeared in 1974 in the  8430 and  8630;
1975 in Argentina, the 30 series was launched with the 2330, 2530, 2730, 3330, 3530, and 4530;
1975, the initial Generation II utility tractors were introduced; these were the  2040,  2240,  2440, and  2640;
In late 1976, a new  addition as the 2840;
1977 saw what came to be known as "Seven in '77"; Deere & Company's first compact diesels, the John Deere "Task Master" tractors, were introduced in the  850 and  950; other than that, the big news was what Deere & Company called "The New Iron Horses", with more horses and more iron; these were the  4040,  4240,  4440,  4640, and the  4840, which replaced the 4630.  The "Iron Horses" featured an improved Sound Guard Body with more sound proofing, hydraulic seat suspension, and Deere's Personal Posture seat as standard equipment.  The 4240, 4440, 4640, and 4840 featured a new engine;
1978 brought the  8440 and  8640 articulated four wheel drive tractors;
1979, late in the year, a third diesel compact was added, the  1050; it had a turbo diesel engine which was unique in its class.  Five new utility tractors were added at the same time, the  2040,  2240,  2440,  2640, and  2940; these five new models had a black and yellow "tiger stripe" on both sides of the hood;
1979 was the first year for the 40 series in Argentina, because the first model are the John Deere 3440, and continues in the 1980s with the 2140, 3140 / 3140 DT, 3540.

1980s
Deere & Company introduced at least 38 new tractors during the 1980s, during a time when over six other competitors merged, were sold, or went out of business altogether:
Two new small compact diesel tractors were added in 1981; these were the PTO  650 and PTO  750.  Three new 4WDs came to market in the fall of 1981; these were the  8450,  8650, and big  8850; the 8850 came with the company's biggest engine, the  V8 engine;
Besides the 8850, the John Deere 844 wheel loader and 990 hydraulic excavator were the only other John Deere products to get this V8 engine; also according to Wayne Broehl's 1984 book, about the John Deere's Company, a larger 4WD tractor than the 8850 was supposed to appear but never did;
In 1982, eleven new 50 series tractors from  up to  debuted. The  1250,  2150,  2350,  2550,  2750,  2950,  4050,  4250,  4450,  4650, and  4850. From the 2150 to the 4850 got another industry leading innovation, in the use of castor action mechanical front-wheel drive, which provided 20 percent more pulling power. Like the front tires of a motor grader, this castor action Mechanical Front Wheel Drive (MFWD) had the front tires lean to give a shorter turning radius. John Deere's 50 Series tractors also offered a new power shift transmission, with 15 operating speeds.
The following year, 1983 brought in the final two 50 Series tractors namely the  1450 and  1650.  When tested in Nebraska, the 1650 proved to be the most fuel efficient tractor ever tested.  A 4020 shadow, namely the  3150 came about in 1985.  This was the first John Deere row crop tractor to have MFWD as standard equipment.;
Three new diesel compacts came to light in 1986; these were the  655,  755,  855 and 900HC.  The 900HC was offset like the 2-cylinder M, and was for niche markets.  The 655, 755, and 855 all had a hydrostatic drive transmission.  The 2355, 2555, 2755, and 2955 were featured as price fighter (economy) tractors in 1986 with less features.;
The following year, 1987 Deere & Company brought out six new models in the  2155,  2355,  2555,  2755,  2955, and  3155;
In October 1988, at the dealer meeting in Denver, Colorado, the new  8560,  8760, and  8960 were introduced;
In early 1989, in Palm Springs, California, six new 55 Series tractors were shown to dealers; these were the  4055,  4255,  4455,  4555,  4755, and  4955; the 4555 was an entirely new model which was the same size as the 4640; These tractors were nearly identical to the iron horse series. The only visual difference being the exhaust pipe was now routed along the cab, now out of sight from the cab.
This year also brought the 70 Series gear driven compact diesels; these were the  670,  770,  870,  970, and  1070.

1990s and Generation III
In 1990, Deere & Company introduced a new hydrostatic compact utility tractor: the 955 with a  three-cylinder diesel engine.

5000 series
In what some industry watchers were calling Generation III, the year 1991 brought a glimpse of what Deere & Company tractors of the 1990s would be like.  Eight new John Deere tractors were introduced in 1991, starting with the three 5000 Series tractors.  These were the  5200,  5300, and  5400.  Two new models, the  3055, and  3255 followed.

Deere & Company is manufacturing 5000 Series of tractors at Sanaswadi, Pune, in India; the range of products from India are listed below. Additionally, the paint schemes changed in 2007. In 2007, Deere & Company made some horsepower rating changes in otherwise unchanged machines. The 5103 came with a black engine and driveline prior to 2007, when they began painting the engine area all green. These are referred to as black belly's or green belly's.
5036C – 
5041C – 
5103 Economy – 
5038D – 
5103 – 
5103S – 
5104 – 
5203S – 
5204 – 
5210 – 
5310 – 
5310 MFWD – 
5410 – 
5510 MFWD –

60 series
For 1992 model year, Deere & Company introduced the  4560, the  4760, and  4960.  They were nearly identical to the 4555, 4755, and 4955 they replaced, with the improvements being improved lighting and safety, hood free of the air intake and exhaust pipe, which was moved to the right corner post of the cab on the 60 Series tractors, and an improved cab entry step with handrail.

6000 and 7000 series
In the fall of 1992, six totally new 6000 and 7000 Series tractors were introduced by Deere & Company; the  6200,  6300,  6400,  7600,  7700, and  7800.  Also the cabs were completely redesigned for better visibility and operator comfort; John Deere's new cabs were a significant improvement over the Sound Guard body which had set the industry standard for two decades.

70 series
The spring of 1993, Deere & Company introduced the four new 70 Series Power Plus 4WD models; these were the  8570,  8770, and a new model, the  8870.  And the first  tractor, the 8970.  These tractors were equipped with an electronic power bulge that would kick in when tough field conditions were encountered.  Later in the summer, the 3055 and 3255 were replaced with the  7200 and  7400.

8000 series
1994 was a red letter year in tractor development for Deere & Company, because that year brought about the most revolutionary row crop tractors the industry had seen up to then.  1994 was the last year of the Sound Guard body from John Deere, with the last one built being a 2WD 4760 model.  It was manufactured on 1994 May 25.  This ended a 22-year run for Sound Guard tractors, that were widely regarded as the most successful tractors ever built.
The new 8000 Series tractors were introduced with state-of-the-art features; the  8100,  8200,  8300, and  8400.  One lone utility tractor, the  5500 was added in the fall of 1995.

TEN series upgrades
1996 saw thirteen (13) new tractors debuted at a big John Deere dealer meeting in New Mexico.
First, all of the 7000 Series tractors were replaced the five 7000 TEN series tractors; these were the  7210,  7410,  7610,  7710, and  7810;
But the big news came with the 8000T Series rubber belted track tractors; there were the 8100T, 8200T, 8300T, and 8400T; these built upon the 8000 Series wheeled tractors;
1997 brought seven new tractors, three in the Advantage Series, and four in the 5000 TEN series models.  The three Advantage models were the  6405,  6605, and  7405.  The  5210,  5310,  5410, and  5510 represent the 5000 TEN series tractors.;
The spring of 1998 revealed the four 6000 TEN tractors; the  6110,  6210,  6310, and  6410.  Another new addition to the long green range in 1998 was the six 4000 Series compact diesel engined tractors; these were the  4100,  4200,  4300,  4400,  4500, and  4600.  An Advantage Series  790 compact diesel engined tractor was also added.

T tracked versions
During the fall of 1998, Deere & Company had a  prototype 9300T track tractor at at least three farm shows. During August 1999, the company had another dealer meeting in Moline, Illinois. It was here that the  9300T, and  9400T were revealed to their John Deere dealers. A  7510 with full four-wheel drive was added. The 8000/8000T Series tractors were replaced with the  8110/8110T,  8210/8210T,  8310/8310T, and  8410/8410T. These tractors got Deere sued by Caterpillar for directly copying their design.

2000s
The 990 was a combination of the old 1050 and the previous 970. They would last until 2007, at which time John Deere re-badged them. They exist in 2012 as the 3005 (790) and the 4005 (990). In the compact and now subcompact segment, these are all that is left that is not hydrostatic.;
The year 2000 was not an active year for new Deere & Company tractor launches, but did yield the  4700.  But the year 2001 produced thirty-two (32) new green-and-yellow tractors.  Starting with the  990 Advantage Series compact diesel tractor, this was only the beginning.  Two new 5005 Series Advantage were also added; these were the  5105 and  5205.;
Early in 2001, Deere & Company introduced the 5020 Series utility tractors; these were the  5220,  5320,  5420, and  5520.
These were the  6403,  6603,  6120,  6220,  6320,  6420, in the smaller 6000 Series tractors;
In the row crop tractor, the ten models were the  8120/8120T,  8220/8220T,  8320/8320T,  8420/8420T, and  8520/8520T.  As has been the case since 1996, Deere & Company has been the only company to offer row crop tractors in both wheel and rubber tracks.;
Deere & Company replaced the 9000 Series 4WD with the  9120,  9220,  9320/9320T,  9420/9420T, and the largest John Deere tractor in history up to that point, the  9520/9520T.  The 8020/9020 tractors have features like independent link suspension and ActiveSeat, to give the driver a more comfortable and productive day in the field.

4000 TEN upgrade
2002, Deere & Company introduced nine new 4000 TEN Series tractors;
1st quarter, the  4110,  4010,  4115,  4210,  4310,  4410,  4510,  4610, and  4710;
Also added were the 6015 Series, which were the  6215,  6415,  6615, and  6715.;
In early 2003, an IVT transmission was added to the options for the 7710 and 7810 tractors; a new  2210 compact diesel engined tractor was also added;
2003, in August, Deere & Company held a big John Deere dealer meeting in Columbus, Ohio; three new 5003 tractors were released, the  5103,  5203, and  5403.

500 hp models arrive
One thing the John Deere dealers in attendance at Columbus saw that did not appear at 'Deere.com' until March 2004 was the new  9620.  The 9620 came after two of Deere & Company competitors introduced  4WDs.

7×20 series
In Columbus, Ohio, Deere & Company announced the replacement of the three larger 7000 TEN tractors; namely the  7720,  7820, and the new  7920; the 7610 was discontinued.
2004 brought the  4120,  4320,  4520, and  4720.  October had the 5025 Series utility tractor introduced; these were the  5225,  5325,  5425, and  5525.;
In 2005, Deere & Company introduced fifteen (15) new tractors; the first models were the 3020 Series tractors; the  3120,  3320,  3520, and  3720; also added was the PTO  2305;
In the late summer, the 9320, 9420 and 9520 were made into scraper specials to meet a niche market.  The annual dealer convention was held in Fort Worth, Texas in August 2005, where the company brought out the 8030/8030T Series row crop tractors; there were five wheeled models and three tracked models.;
The following were introduced; the  8130,  8230,  8330,  8430,  8530,  8230T,  8330T, and  8430T; when tested in Nebraska the 8430 was tested as the most fuel efficient row crop tractor ever tested.

2006
The Deere & Company annual dealer meeting was held in Omaha, Nebraska; the launches included:
The  3203, and  5403;
The Omaha get together produced the smaller 6030 Premium, and the larger 7030 Series tractors;
6030 Series of the  6230,  6330, and  6430;
7030 Series of the  7630,  7730,  7830, and  7930.

2007
A new series of 5003 tractors launched in the summer, consisting of the  5103,  5203,  5303, and  5403.

The Deere & Company big meeting was held in August 2007 in Cincinnati, Ohio; the John Deere dealers saw four new nursery and greenhouse tractors, which would not appear on the 'Deere.com' website until February 5, 2008; these would be the:

At the Cincinnati dealer meeting, the dealers also saw the regular 6030 / 7030, and the Premium 6030 Series tractors:
The  6230,  6330,  6430,  7130,  7230, and  7330; the only difference between the two series was that the Premium Series had the  7430;
But the biggest tractors seen in this Cincinnati meeting were the 9030 Series 4WD tractors between : the  9230,  9330,  9430/9430T,  9530/9530T, and  9630/9630T;
The  9120 was discontinued;
The 9430, 9530, and 9630 were also available as scraper tractor models;
The new compact  4105 was in John Deere dealer lots in late December 2007.

2008
In early 2008, Deere & Company introduced another compact diesel engined tractor, the  3005, which is essentially an updated John Deere 870.  Followed by the new 31 engine PTO  2720 later in the year.

On the back of the John Deere publication The Furrow (Summer 2008) is a signup for new equipment.  Deere & Company had another dealer meeting in late July 2008, to introduce many new utility tractors.  But the real announcement came with John Deere introducing a new worldwide numbering scheme for the entire range of compact and agricultural tractors.

Power ratings / model numbers
From the 2008 model year range, Deere & Company nomenclature on the engine horsepower output for individual models will now be advertised in official literature and online using the metric system per the International Organization for Standardization (ISO) 97/68/EC standard for determining net rated engine drawbar power output; the metric horsepower value will be used in the model name.
The first digit will state size;
The next three will state rated engine output in metric horsepower;
A new letter will be added (currently D, E, or M) to state specification level:
R being a high specification machine (like the Premium series in the 6000 and 7000 series);
M to denote a mid specification;
E/D to denote a low-specification, or "value specification", (like the 03 and 05 series in the 6000 and 5000 respectively);
A sixth digit describes special configurations (like "T" for Tracks on the 8RT series tractors).

Example
For example, the new 3032E tractor will be a 3000 with  rated engine; the E is low-specification.  This tractor represents the 2007 model year 3203 for its specification, not to be mistaken for the 3320 which has the same horsepower but more features and at a higher price.  Over the next few years, all tractors will get this scheme.  The issue is that Deere is using rated engine horsepower in the name, not PTO horsepower, which is usually less.

2008 models (new nomenclature)

In 2008, the first John Deere tractors to get the new naming scheme were the 5D, 5E, 5E Limited edition, and the 6D Series tractors.  These tractors were introduced at the annual Deere & Company dealer meeting; this year's event was held in Denver, Colorado.

The biggest John Deere tractors in the new range were the  6D models.

According to the 'Deere.com' website, Deere & Company introduced two new diesel engined 3E Series tractors. This pair of new 3E Series tractors is on page two of The Furrow, December 2008 edition. Both new 3E models would appear in early October 2008. These would be the  3032E and  3038E. ProMagazine.com reports that this pair is for house owners who want a tractor that could take on everyday jobs, some features are: diesel engine, twin touch pedals, hydrostatic transmission, standard 4WD, optional cruise control, power steering, a power take-off (PTO) that is electronically engaged.

2009 models
On March 17, 2009, Deere.com announced the new  7530 Premium tractor.

During the week of August 13, 2009, the company had another big dealer meeting in Omaha, Nebraska, to introduce the new 8R/8RT row crop and track tractors to their dealers. On August 20, 2009, at Deere.com, a news release was posted on the 8R, 8RT, and two new 5105M specialty tractors. Six new green-and-yellow 8R row crop tractors  8225R,  8245R,  8270R,  8295R,  8320R, and the  8345R. The 8225R is the only one available as a two-wheel-drive model. Optional IVT or Powershift transmissions. In John Deere nomenclature, the first number equals size, the next three numbers are the engine horsepower, and the letter at the end stands for capability. Also shown to the dealers were the new 8RT rubber track tractor models. These three models are the  8295RT,  8320RT, and the  8345RT. The T at the end stands for tracks; other than that, the numbers in the 8RT Series are the same in their 8R counterparts.

All nine 8R/8RT tractors are powered by the company's  PowerTech Plus six-cylinder diesel engine. Two other lesser known tractors were also introduced by the company are the 5105ML orchard and poultry tractors. The horsepower is  engine and PTO . One version of the 5105ML comes configured to work in orchards and vineyards, while the other version is a low-profile tractor for work in poultry barns.

2010s

2010 models

In August 2010, Deere & Company had another dealer meeting in Cincinnati, Ohio, to introduce still more tractors. This was confirmed at Deere.com on August 26, 2010, with the announcement of more new 8R/8RT Series tractors. The new models are 2011 model year tractors, with several improvements. These would be the 8235R, 8260R, 8285R, 8310R, 8335R, and 8360R wheel tractors, ranging from  rated engines. Besides the six wheel tractors, three new 8RT track tractors would also be added. There would be the  rated engine 8310RT, 8335RT, and the 8360RT. One of the major changes with these nine green-and-yellow tractors was the new PowerTech PSX  dual turbocharged diesel. This is an Interim Tier 4 (IT4) diesel engine. On January 1, 2011, EPA Tier 4 regulations began, thus the new PowerTech diesel in these tractors. Despite their competitors going with SCR to counter this, John Deere uses exhaust gas recirculation (EGR). To tell these new 8R tractors apart from the earlier 2010 tractors, John Deere put new wrap-around lights up front. Also the model number has been moved close to the front just off the black grill on both sides. Another characteristic is the new large black muffler on the right corner of the cab. Other improvements engineered into these tractors are JDLink, ActiveCommand Steering (ACS), Infinitely Variable Transmission (IVT) AutoMode, GS3 CommandCenter, and the StarFire 3000 receiver.

In a 2010 October meeting in Florida, John Deere dealers were shown the new 1023E and 1026E sub compact tractors that the company announced in February 2011.

2018
In 2018, John Deere has the following tractors:

9R, 9RT, 9RX - 4WD 
6R, 7R, 8R, 8RT, 8RX - row crop
5090EL, 5075GL and 5125ML - specialty
1, 2, 3, 4, 5, 6 series - utility

2020s

References

External links

www.Deere.com — John Deere US, at Deere & Company official website
Global Country Selector — John Deere Worldwide, at Deere & Company

 
Tractors
Lawn and garden tractors